Cathaymyrus is a genus of Early Cambrian cephalochordate known from the Chengjiang locality in Yunnan Province, China. Both species have a long segmented body with no distinctive head. The segments resemble the v-shaped muscle blocks found in similar cephalochordates such as Amphioxus. A long linear impression runs along the "back" of the body looking something like a chordate notochord. Cathaymyrus is related to Pikaia, another cephalochordate from the Burgess Shale.

See also
Maotianshan shales 
Haikouichthys 
Myllokunmingia

References

Cambrian chordates
Maotianshan shales fossils
Cephalochordata
Prehistoric chordate genera
Cambrian genus extinctions